The Chipwich is an ice cream sandwich made of ice cream between two chocolate chip cookies and then rolled in chocolate chips. The Chipwich name and logo is trademarked by Crave Better Foods, LLC based in Cos Cob, Connecticut.

The original, created by Americans Richard LaMotta and Sam Metzger (1942–2010) in New York City in 1978, was made up of vanilla ice cream sandwiched by two chocolate chip cookies, with the sides rolled in chocolate chips, which stick to the ice cream.

History
While ice cream sandwiches have been sold in New York City since the 1890s, New York lawyer Richard LaMotta created the Chipwich in 1978. He introduced it to the city with a guerrilla marketing campaign, training sixty street cart vendors (mostly students) to sell the new product on the streets of New York, for a dollar each; this rapidly established Chipwich as a successful brand. Some twenty-five thousand Chipwiches were sold the first day, and within two weeks the company was selling 40,000 a day.

The small, independent company struggled to find capital to expand. In 1984, Chipwich sought Chapter 11 bankruptcy protection.  By 1987, co-founders Metzger and LaMotta had reorganized the company and obtained a $1 million investment from Swedish holding company Hexagon AB, which guaranteed loans and licensed its products. In 1992, the company was back in Chapter 11 bankruptcy after incurring a $1.4 million loss on sales of $4.8 million; an accounting scandal involving inventory overstatements at Peltz Food, a subsidiary headed by Robert Peltz, were at the root of much of the problem.

CoolBrands International bought Chipwich in 2002, becoming North America's third-largest ice cream vendor. Due to a series of financial difficulties, which began with the loss of its Weight Watchers/Smart Ones frozen food licence in 2004, CoolBrands sold Chipwich, Eskimo Pie and Real Fruit to the Dreyer's division of Nestlé in 2007. This was part of a larger divestiture of core assets which left the company as little more than a publicly listed empty shell.
By 2009, Nestlé had stopped production of the original Chipwich, reportedly because it competed with its own Toll House chocolate chip cookie ice cream sandwich. 

The trademark was acquired in 2017 by Crave Better Foods, LLC of Cos Cob, Connecticut.  The product was relaunched in 2018 in the U.S. In 2020, the brand introduced a new flavor, Birthday Cake, to its product line.

Critical response 
In May of 2018, the New York Times described the Chipwich as the number-one treat in its article, "The 7 Greatest Packaged Frozen Treats, Ranked." The article describes the Chipwich as having "an ideal softness all the way through," with "mellow, comforting flavors." The review notes that the cookies and ice cream filling have matching consistencies,  making it easy to eat.

In pop culture 
The Chipwich is mentioned as one of Doug's favorite snacks in The King of Queens. Jessica Huang, the matriarch in the 2015 based ABC family drama, Fresh Off the Boat, eats one in nearly every episode. A Chipwich vendor and cart appear in an episode of the Fox Broadcasting Company television series, The Simpsons (season 4, episode 10, "Lisa's First Word").

In the 1983  movie Spring Break a few goons question the owner of a Chipwich cart while looking for a missing kid. In the 2015 screwball comedy Mistress America, Mamie-Claire and Dylan store Chipwiches next to their weed. Tony takes a Chipwich, but forgets to get one for his girlfriend, Nicolette.

YouTuber Jacksfilms named his third puppy Chipwich and the Homestar Runner character Strong Bad says Homsar was raised by a cup of coffee and a Chipwich.

See also 

 Sandwich cookie

References

External links

 Chipwich Official Website

Ice cream brands
Food and drink introduced in 1978
Products introduced in 1978
2002 mergers and acquisitions
2007 mergers and acquisitions
2017 mergers and acquisitions
Cookie sandwiches
Frozen desserts
Companies based in Fairfield County, Connecticut
Ice cream sandwiches
CoolBrands International